Iulian is a masculine Romanian given name. Notable people with the name include:

Iulian Arhire (1976), Romanian former professional footballer
Iulian Dumitraș (1982), Romanian rugby union player
Iulian Filipescu (1974), former Romanian footballer
Iulian Grozescu (1839-1872), Austro-Hungarian Romanian poet and journalist 
Iulian Levinski (1859–1923), Bessarabian politician
Iulian Mihu (1926–1999), Romanian film director
Iulian Pop (1880–1923), Austro-Hungarian and Romanian lawyer and politician
Iulian Tameș (1978), Romanian footballer
Iulian Teodosiu (1994), Romanian sabre fencer
Iulian Vesper  (1908–1986), Austro-Hungarian-born Romanian poet and prose writer

Romanian masculine given names